Llyn Arenig Fawr is a lake and reservoir located near the summit of Arenig Fawr, a mountain in North Wales.

The lake's primary purpose is to supply water to the nearby town of Bala and the numerous small villages in the surrounding area. From the lake there is an energetic uphill walk to the summit of Arenig Fawr, from which there are extensive views.

Eggs of the gwyniad, a freshwater fish previously restricted to nearby Bala Lake, were introduced to Llyn Arenig Fawr between 2003 and 2007
as a conservation measure.

References

External links
www.geograph.co.uk : photos of Llyn Arenig Fawr and surrounding area

Llanycil
Arenig Fawr
Arenig Fawr